Tariff Man may refer to:

 William McKinley, the 25th president of the United States, who became known for calling himself "tariff man"
 Donald Trump, the 45th president of the United States, who called himself "tariff man" and is nicknamed it